0N (zero N) or 0-N may refer to:

0N or 0°N, an expression of the latitude of the equator
0n, an abbreviation for Zero norm in mathematics
HP 0N, ISO/IEC 8859-1 character set on printers by Hewlett-Packard

See also
N0 (disambiguation)